Gloria Hooper may refer to:

Gloria Hooper, Baroness Hooper (born 1939), British politician and lawyer
Gloria Hooper (athlete) (born 1992), Italian sprinter